Hooge can refer to:

Hooge, Prince Su, Manchu prince of the Qing Dynasty
Houvenkopf Mountain known as "Hooge Kop"
Hooge, Germany, an island and municipality in northern Germany
Hooge (Ypres), a village in Belgium, now part of the city of Ypres
 Hooge in World War I